Mary, Mother of Jesus Mosque, also called in Arabic, Maryam Umm Eisa Masjid (Masjid Maryam Umm ‘Īsā) is a mosque located in Al Mushrif, a central neighborhood in the city of Abu Dhabi, the capital city of the United Arab Emirates. It was built in 1989 as Mohammed Bin Zayed Mosque, and named after Mohammed bin Zayed Al Nahyan, Ruler of Abu Dhabi. 

On 14 June 2017, Sheikh Mohammed bin Zayed Al Nahyan decided to rename the mosque to "Mary, Mother of Jesus Mosque". The change was done as an initiative exemplifying the values of co-existence among religions in the UAE, as well as to honour Mary, Mother of Jesus who is a respected figure in Islam.

The mosque complex is at one corner and besides by a Christian community of numerous church complexes, amongst them are the St. Joseph's Cathedral, Abu Dhabi, the Church of St. Anthony and the neighbouring St. Andrew's Church.

See also
 List of mosques in the United Arab Emirates

References

Mosques in Abu Dhabi
Culture in Abu Dhabi
Tourist attractions in Abu Dhabi
Mosques completed in 1989
1989 establishments in the United Arab Emirates